State Route 200 (SR 200) was a  route that served as a connection between State Route 21 and U.S. Highway 278 through western Piedmont in Calhoun County.

Route description
This route used to serve as a western bypass of the city of Piedmont. The southern terminus of SR 200 was located at its intersection with SR 21 in southwest Piedmont. From this point, the route traveled in a northerly direction before reaching its northern terminus at US 278; however, the route was signed East-West.

History
State Route 200 was decommissioned in January 2019. ALDOT transferred SR 21 from its original alignment into Piedmont, Alabama onto former SR 200. SR 21 now ends at US 278.

Major intersections

References

External links

200
Transportation in Calhoun County, Alabama